Austen's brown hornbill (Anorrhinus austeni) is a species of hornbill found in forests from northeastern India and south to Vietnam and northern Thailand. It is sometimes included as a subspecies of Tickell's brown hornbill.

Description 

It is a medium-sized hornbill, brown with white-tipped tail. The male has white cheeks and throat, pale creamy bill, and rufous-brown underparts. The female has a dark head and throat. It inhabits the deciduous and evergreen forests from lowland plains to edge of pine and oak forest in hills, but mainly in the hill forest. It feeds on fruit and small animals; its diet includes many species of fruits, together with many arthropods, also bats, snakes, lizards, snails, earthworms, and chicks and eggs of other birds. It occurs in territorial groups of 2–15.

It is a co-operative breeder, with a dominant breeding pair, male helpers and additional females.  They nest in natural cavities or in old holes of the great slaty woodpecker. In India, the best place to see this species is the Namdapha National Park, Changlang District, Arunachal Pradesh.

The name commemorates the naturalist Henry Haversham Godwin-Austen.

References

Austen's brown hornbill
Birds of Northeast India
Birds of Southeast Asia
Birds of Myanmar
Birds of Vietnam
Birds of Laos
Birds of Cambodia
Birds of Thailand
Austen's brown hornbill